The 2002 E3 Prijs Vlaanderen was the 45th edition of the E3 Prijs Vlaanderen cycle race and was held on 30 March 2002. The race started and finished in Harelbeke. The race was won by Dario Pieri of the Alessio team.

General classification

References

2002 in Belgian sport
2002